Wilderness medicine is a rapidly evolving field and is of increasing importance as more people engage in hiking, climbing, kayaking, and other potentially hazardous activities in the backcountry. The modern definition of wilderness medicine is "medical care delivered in those areas where fixed or transient geographic challenges reduce the availability of, or alter requirements for, medical or patient movement resources".

'Extreme, expedition and wilderness medicine are modern and rapidly evolving specialties that address the spirit of adventure and exploration. The relevance of and interest in these specialties are changing rapidly to match the underlying activities, which include global exploration, adventure travel, and military deployments. Extreme, expedition, and wilderness medicine share themes of providing best available medical care in the outdoors, especially in austere or remote settings. Early clinical and logistics decision making can often have important effects on subsequent outcomes. There are lessons to be learned from out-of-hospital care, military medicine, humanitarian medicine, and disaster medicine that can inform in-hospital medicine, and vice-versa. The future of extreme, expedition, and wilderness medicine will be defined by both recipients and practitioners, and empirical observations will be transformed by evidence-based practice.

A primary focus of the field is the evaluation, prioritization (triage), preliminary treatment of acute injuries or illnesses which occur in those environments and the emergency evacuation of victims. However, back country rescue and wilderness first aid is not the sole activity of wilderness medical professionals, who are also concerned with many additional topics. These include but are not limited to:
 Prolonged Field Care
 Secondary care follow up to first aid in remote settings, such as expeditions
 Evaluation of experience and issuance of updated protocols for first response and secondary care
 The prevention of wilderness medical emergencies
 Epidemiological studies
 Public policy advisement to wilderness planning agencies, and issuance of guidelines to disaster planning agencies, professional guides and amateur back country enthusiast organizations

Scope
Wilderness medicine is a varied sub-specialty, encompassing skills and knowledge from many other specialties. The specific curricula will vary but an example can be seen in the curriculum for Fellowship in the Academy of Wilderness Medicine (FAWM).

Diving and hyperbaric medicine
 Physics and physiology of depth
 Dive medicine
 Dysbarisms and barotrauma

Tropical and travel medicine
 Immunizations for travel
 Tick-borne illness, malaria and tropical diseases
 Parasites and protozoal infections in the traveler
 Traveler's diarrhea
 Women's issues in traveling
 Safety and security while traveling
 Travel medicine
 Travel and tropical dermatology
 Fever in the returned traveler
 Viral Haemorrhagic Fevers
 STDs in the traveler

High-altitude and mountaineering medicine
 Physics and physiology of altitude
 AMS, HAPE and HACE
 The effect of high altitude on underlying medical conditions

Expedition medicine
 Basic (emergency) field dentistry
 Expedition planning, pre- and post-expedition responsibilities
 Camp safety and layout

Survival, field craft and equipment

 Survival techniques and equipment
 Water procurement
 Food procurement
 Hiking and trekking
 Foot gear and care of the feet
 Clothing selection for wilderness survival
 Land navigation

Safety, rescue and evacuation
 Search and rescue theory and practice
 Evacuation of injured persons

Sports medicine and physiology
 rock climbing
 ultramarathons
 endurance sports
 kayaking / sailing etc

Preventive medicine, field sanitation and hygiene
 Field sanitation and hygiene measures
 Vector control and barriers
 Water purification methods

General environmental medicine
 Lightning injuries
 Submersion and drowning
 Envenomation and toxicology
 Animal attacks
 Heat Illness and dehydration
 Cold injuries and hypothermia
 Nutrition in extreme environments
 Aerospace medicine

Improvised medicine
 Improvised field wound management
 Improvisational medical techniques in the wilderness

Disaster and humanitarian assistance
 Triage
 Field hospital provision
 Malnutrition therapy

Wilderness emergencies and trauma management 
 Pre-hospital patient assessment
 Pain management in the wilderness setting
 Emergency airway management
 Psychological response to injury and stress
 Management of trauma and injuries
 Prolonged Field Care (PFC)

Epidemiology
The Center for Disease Control in the U.S., and its corresponding agencies in other nations, also monitor leading health threats, pathogen vectors in conjunction with local departments of health, such as Lyme disease, plague and typhus which may be carried by small mammals in a back country or wilderness context.

Austere environments interdisciplinary interface
Insights from the field of Military Combat Tactical Care (TCCC) interact with wilderness medical practice and protocol development. Moreover, new products and technologies tested in combat are adopted by wilderness medical personnel and vice versa. Experts in wilderness medicine come from various professional groups and specialist backgrounds including the military.  More recently, advances in the development of Prolonged Field Care (PFC) guidelines has lead to the development of military and civilian PFC courses, such as the international Austere Emergency Care course.

Notable Individuals 
 Prof Paul Auerbach (January 4, 1951 – June 23, 2021)(Wilderness Medicine)
 Prof Mark Hannaford (Extreme Medicine)  
 Dr Jon Dallimore (Expedition Medicine)
 Dr. Luanne Freer (Founder Everest ER)
 Dr Peter Hackett (Altitude Medicine)
 Dr Seth C. Hawkins  (Wilderness Medicine)
 Dr Sean Hudson MBE (Expedition & Wilderness Medicine) 
 Prof Chris Imray (Altitude Physiology)
 Dr Kenneth Iserson (Improvised Medicine)
 Col Sean Keenan (Austere Medicine)
 Dr Burjor Langdana (Expedition Dentistry)
 Dr Hannah Lock (Expedition & Mountain Medicine)
 Mr Aebhric O’Kelly (Special Operations Medicine, Prolonged Field Care)

Applications to Covid-19
, studies and trials are underway that examine the possible benefits of nitric oxide in the treatment of COVID-19. This research is related to the role of nasal breathing in the creation of nitric oxide, which increases oxygen absorption in the lungs. Nitric oxide was also investigated as an experimental therapy for SARS.

Brian Strickland, MD, a fellow in Wilderness Medicine at Massachusetts General Hospital who studies "acute respiratory distress" in high altitudes, is applying this research towards COVID-19. He is currently involved in clinical trials which apply the use of inhaled nitric oxide as a treatment for COVID-19. This approach was inspired by the work of associate professor of Emergency Medicine at the Harvard Medical School N. Stuart Harris, who has been studying the effects of altitude sickness on mountain climbers, such as those who climb Mount Everest. Harris noticed that the consequences of high level altitude sickness on the human body mirrored COVID-19's dysfunctional impact on the lungs. His focus on nitric oxide comes from its role in being able to breathe in high altitudes.

Specialist Qualifications 
Internationally there is a huge variety in the medical training for wilderness medicine, with a few educational institutions specialising in this field.  The College of Remote and Offshore Medicine (CoROM) in Malta offers undergraduate, postgraduate and short courses in various wilderness medicine-related topics. Many of the courses offered by CoROM also award Fellowship credits with the Wilderness Medical Society. The Wilderness Medical Society runs the internationally renowned Fellowship programme as well as diplomas in marine and mountain medicine. An Extreme Medicine masters degree is run in partnership between World Extreme Medicine a private company and the University of Exeter and offers part and full-time postgraduate options. The speciality of Tropical medicine is generally considered a separate (but aligned) field, in which there are many specialist qualifications.

Diplomas 
 PGDip Extreme Medicine University of Exeter
 DiMM / DipMtnMed (Mountain Medicine)
 DipExpWildMed (RCPSG)
 DiDMM (Dive and Marine Medicine)
 DipROM (RCSEd)

Bachelors 
 BSc Remote Paramedic Practice (CoROM)

Masters Degrees 
 MSc Extreme Medicine, University of Exeter.
 MSc Austere Critical Care

Fellowships 
 FAWM - Fellow of the Wilderness Medical Society™ (3-5 year educational programme)
 MFAWM - Master Fellow of the Wilderness Medical Society™
 FEWM - Fellow of Extreme and Wilderness Medicine (awarded for achievements and contribution to extreme medicine)
 FRGS - Fellow of the Royal Geographical Society (may be awarded for achievement in extreme, wilderness or expedition medicine)

See also

 Wilderness Medical Society
 List of wilderness medical emergencies
 Wilderness medical emergency
 Emergency medicine
 Combat medicine
 Remote physiological monitoring
 History of medicine
 Polytrauma
 Timeline of medicine and medical technology
 Aid station

References

External links

 
 Wilderness Medics, produced by Oregon Public Broadcasting.

Medical emergencies
Wilderness medical emergencies